Raymond Beebe McCandless (October 6, 1889 – January 8, 1931) was an American football player and coach of football, basketball, and baseball. He served as the head football coach at Chadron State College in 1919, Nebraska Wesleyan University from 1920 to 1922, Bowling Green State Normal School—now known as Bowling Green State University—in 1923, Bethany College in Bethany, West Virginia for the 1924 season, and York College in York, Nebraska from 1928 to 1930, compiling a career college football record of 29–37–10. McCandless was also the head basketball coach at Nebraska Wesleyan from 1920 to 1923, at Bowling Green State Normal during the 1923–24 season, and at Bethany for the 1924–25 season, amassing a career college basketball record of tallying a mark of 60–43. In addition, he was the head baseball coach at Bowling Green State Normal in the spring of 1924, tallying a mark of 2–2–2. McCandless played football at Nebraska Wesleyan. He died on January 8, 1931, in York, Nebraska.

Early life, education, and military service
The fourth son of Lucian McCandless and Amanda Gandy, McCandless was born in Broken Bow, Nebraska. He attended Broken Bow schools and graduated at 16. In 1909 he, attended the University of Nebraska, and in 1910, the Broken Bow Business College. The following year he entered Nebraska Wesleyan University, graduating in 1914 with honors for popularity, scholarship and athletics. He then began his coaching career at Nebraska City.

McCandless volunteered with the Sixth Nebraska Infantry in 1917, and was appointed Second Lieutenant of the 127th Machine Gun Battalion. He saw service in France during World War I with the 29th Infantry Division.

Head coaching record

Football

References

External links
 

1889 births
1931 deaths
Bethany Bison football coaches
Bethany Bison men's basketball coaches
Bowling Green Falcons baseball coaches
Bowling Green Falcons football coaches
Bowling Green Falcons men's basketball coaches
Chadron State Eagles football coaches
Nebraska Wesleyan Prairie Wolves football coaches
Nebraska Wesleyan Prairie Wolves football players
Nebraska Wesleyan Prairie Wolves men's basketball coaches
York Panthers football coaches
People from Broken Bow, Nebraska
Coaches of American football from Nebraska
Players of American football from Nebraska
Baseball coaches from Nebraska
Basketball coaches from Nebraska